Konstadinos Zikos (born 24 April 1998) is a Greek sprinter competing mostly in the 60 and 100 metres. He represented his country at the 2019 and 2021 European Indoor Championships finishing fifth on the first occasion.

International competitions

Personal bests
Outdoor
100 metres – 10.41 (+0.8 m/s, Kalamata 2019)
200 metres – 21.88 (-0.4 m/s, Trikala 2019)
Indoor
60 metres – 6.62 (Piraeus 2019)

References

1998 births
Living people
Greek male sprinters
Sportspeople from Trikala
Athletes (track and field) at the 2022 Mediterranean Games
Mediterranean Games competitors for Greece
21st-century Greek people